Teiwa (also referred to as Tewa) is a Papuan language spoken on the Pantar island in eastern Indonesia. The island is the second largest in the Alor archipelago, lying just west of the largest island Alor.

Teiwa is a morphosyntactically simple language with little inflection and is as such described as an isolating language, also known as an analytic language. It is pronounced by a complex pronoun system.

Nomenclature
Teiwa is also known as Bahasa Teiwa (the Teiwa language) in Indonesia. Teiwa itself is a nominal compound and can be translated as tei wa,  meaning "tree leaf". The term "Teiwa" derives from the name of the main clan that speaks it. Generally, when Teiwa speakers refer to their own language, especially to differentiate it from the national language Indonesian, they call it "pitarau" (our language).

Classification
Teiwa is often classified as part of the Trans-New Guinea language family, but this is disputed. One reason is little lexical proof as well as the large geographical distance from the main island of New Guinea. An alternative classification is as part of the Timor-Alor-Pantar language family, which is approximately 3000 years old. Within this language family, Teiwa is further categorized within the sub-family of the Alor-Pantar languages, which are 20 in number. This classification bases on the high number of cognates as well as very similar pronoun systems.

Background
Teiwa is spoken on the island of Pantar, which is part of the Alor Archipelago, located between Australia and Indonesia. The island is located approximately 1000 km from the main island of New Guinea. It stretches 50 km from north to south, and between 11 and 29 km from east to west. The island is split into two distinct geographic regions: the dry and less populated lowlands in the west, and the highlands in the east, which are mountainous, volcanic and densely populated.

There were 4000 documented native speakers of Teiwa in 2010. The speakers live primarily in the desas (administrative villages in Indonesia) Lebang, Boweli, Kalib, Nule, Kadir, and Madar, a village of 460 inhabitants (as of 2007). Lebang is the main village, where Teiwa was still spoken by most people, young and old. Nevertheless, the national language of Indonesian as well as the Chinese-influenced Alor-Malay tend to be spoken by the younger generations and used for teaching in schools. As a result of this dwindling number of native speakers, Teiwa is listed as an endangered language.

The Grammar of Teiwa by Marian Klamer is the only linguistic documentation besides a short word list from Stokhof (1975). Klamer gathered most of her data in the village of Madar.

Phonology
The following is a phonological description of Teiwa:

Consonants
Teiwa has an inventory of 20 consonants, a high amount relative to other Papuan languages. In the table below, the orthographic representation of the sound is given in brackets to the right. The contrast between the pharyngeal and glottal fricative shows itself as exceptional within the languages of Eastern Indonesia, as is the existence of both liquids /l/ and /r/. 

Vowels
Teiwa has an inventory of 5 cardinal vowels. The two high vowels occur as short (/i/, /u/) and long (/uː/, /iː/).  As in the consonant table, the orthographic representations are given in the brackets to the right.

The allophones of /a/ are the short  and the long .

Grammar
The grammar of Teiwa is as follows:

Grammatical relations
Grammatical relations are the relations between argument and predicate. In Teiwa, these are formally expressed through pronouns from the object and subject paradigms, as well as a strict constituent order.

The subject relation is the agent argument of a transitive verb, from hereon denoted with A, or the single argument of an intransitive predicate, from hereon denoted with S. Both are encoded similarly.

The object relation is the non-agent argument of a transitive verb, from hereon denoted with P.

Basic constituent order
Teiwa is syntactically head-final, with Object-Verb constituent order: preverbal subject and object, sentence final verbs, negations, and conjunctions.

With intransitive verbs, there is SV-order. With transitive verbs, there is APV-order.

The A of the second (transitive) verb tu'uk coreferences with (shares the same reference as) the S of the first (intransitive) verb yaa in the example above.

In this example, the Subject (A) is the pronominal, and the object (P) is the lexical NP (noun phrase).

Personal pronouns 
There are three pronoun paradigms in Teiwa: subject, object, and possessive. The second syllable of the long pronoun is a copy of the theme vowel with the addition of an -n.

There is a contrast of inclusive-exclusive first person plural, one of the most prominent features to diffuse from the Austronesian languages into the Papuan languages.

Subject pronouns
Subject pronouns appear before the object and verb. 

The long subject pronoun is used to set contrastive focus (me, not you), which can further be marked with la as the focus NP. They look nearly identical to the free object pronouns, save for the 3s and 3p.elsewhere pronouns.

The short subject pronoun is a "reduced pronoun" which can stand alone in place of nominal constituents, and is separable from the verb. Its paradigm is nearly identical to that of the object prefixes, except for the 3s, 3p, and 3p.elsewhere pronouns.

Both the short and long object pronouns can express S and A.

Object pronouns

The underlined pronouns are a reminder of the differences to the long subject pronoun and short subject pronoun paradigms, respectively.

The object prefix has a consonantal and syllabic (in parentheses) form: the consonantal form appears before a verb beginning with a vowel, and the syllabic form appears before a verb beginning with a consonant.

The object pronoun is for both animate and inanimate referents, whereas the object prefix is exclusively for animate referents.

With the 3p (third person plural) object prefix, the differentiation of number is lost. In this case, number is specified through use of the additional pronoun ga'an (singular), iman (plural), or the plural word non in the object NP.

The 3s (third person singular) object pronoun maintains a further purpose as a demonstrative pronoun to introduce new participants into the discourse.

Possessive pronouns

The final two pronouns, elsewhere and distributive, are unique. The 3p.elsewhere pronoun is used in a situation where the speaker cannot see the referent, because the referent is somewhere else.

Contrast this with the standard, unmarked form (3p):

The distributive possessive pronoun (ta'an, ta, or ta-) refers to a (non-collective) plural number of human referents, often in reciprocal contexts.

One more special possessive pronoun is li'in, which marks plurality of the possessor NP, and only as an adnominal modifier.

Compare:

Nouns
In Teiwa, the noun typically appears as head of the NP. The noun, with a few exceptions, cannot be reduplicated, unlike verbs, adverbs, and adjectives. (See Reduplication below.)

There is no marking for number, gender, or case on nouns. Instead, person and number is marked via a possessor prefix on the noun.

Noun phrases
In possessed NP's, the possessor (the noun which possesses) precedes the possessee (the noun which is possessed), as in the examples below.

In non-possessed NP's, the noun comes first, followed by the modifying element, such as an adjective.

Noun classes
The Teiwa nouns can be divided into two main classes: Proper nouns and common nouns.

Proper nouns 
Proper nouns are not modifiable. Examples are listed below.

Male names: Edi, Goli, Lius, Mase, Nabas, Ribu
Female names: Bruang, Leti, Malai, Mani, Sam
Family names: Biri, Blegar, Bui, Lau, Qoli, Ribu, Unu
Clan names: Barawasi, Burilak, Loxoq, Perang Tubi, Qailipi

Common nouns 
The common nouns can be further divided into subclasses:

Nouns with alienable possession 
In this subclass the possessor prefix is optional. Focus can be placed with use of a long pronoun. Examples include: yaf 'house', kon 'shirt', qavif 'goat'.

Nouns with inalienable possession 
Here the possessor prefix is obligatory, to the point that native speakers will not recognize the word without the prefix. Nouns with inalienable possession include body parts, and kinship terms (except for emaq 'wife' where the prefix is optional as with alienable possession).

Locational nouns 
This last subclass of nouns denote location. Examples include: wanan 'side', fan 'front', siban 'behind', ragan 'outside', tag 'up(stairs); above speaker (relatively close)'.

Nominalization
There is no dedicated morphology for nominalization in Teiwa. Instead the third person (3p) possessor prefix -ga has a secondary function of attaching to the root form of adjectives, locational nouns, adverbs, and question words.

Verbs
Teiwa verbs carry no marking for case or gender. There is only one verbal suffix;

-(a)n for the marking of realis status. Only verbs take an object prefix. Inflected prefixes index person and number traits of animate objects on the verb. Subjects and inanimate objects are not indexed on the verb.

Teiwa has intransitive and transitive verbs. The transitive verbs are monotransitive, meaning they have a single grammatical object.

Verb classes

Transitive verbs
The transitive verbs in Teiwa can be divided into numerous sub classes, based on how they encode animate and inanimate objects differently. In this case, animate or inanimate refers explicitly to a third person referent, since first and second person referents are inherently animate.

Class (i) Verbs with an object prefix, with an animate object ("sb-somebody")
This class expresses the object with an object-marking prefix on the verb. The prefix marks for person and number. The lexical NP is optional and may be used to clarify or disambiguate the referent.

Examples of verbs are: an ‘give sb’, ‘an ‘sell to sb’, ayas ‘throw at sb’, bun ‘answer sb’, fin ‘catch sb’, liin ‘invite sb’, regan ‘ask sb’, sas ‘feed sb’, walas ‘tell sb’, wei ‘bathe sb’

Examples of such verbs in sentence constructions:

The prefix ga- on the verb -uyan marks for third person singular object, that is for qavif,  'goat'. Goat is an animate object.

Here similarly, the prefix ga- on the verb -walas marks for third person singular object, that is for yivar,  'dog'. Dog is an animate object.

Class (ii) Verbs without an object prefix, with inanimate object ("sth-something")
Here the verb encodes the object as a separate nominal constituent. In this class the encoding with a prefix is disallowed.

Examples of such verbs are: bali ‘see sth’, ol ‘buy sth’, paai ‘cut sth in many small pieces’, put ‘cut off (grass)’
An example in a sentence construction:

The verbs in this sentence have no object prefix, and the object 'fish' is inanimate (because it is no longer living).

Class (iii) Transitive verbs that take either animate or inanimate objects
iiia. Transitive verbs with prefixed animate object OR free (unfixed) inanimate object

With free inanimate object (object prefix not bound to verb).

With prefixed animate object

Notice the important difference in meaning with the use a prefixed pronoun versus a free pronoun!

iiib. Verbs with an animate OR inanimate object, both as a prefix

Third person object prefixes marking animate or inanimate:

The contrasts are illustrated in the below translations:

A glottal stop is used for animate objects. The canonical form is used for inanimate objects.

Sound verbs
An interesting class of verbs constituting verbs for sounds made by animals or objects.

Experiencer predicates 
These are predicates formed with the bodypart noun -om 'inside'

Reduplication
Reduplication is a morphological process to express greater intensity or the repeated/ongoing nature of an event. In Teiwa, the entire root is copied; there exists no productive process for syllable reduplication.

of verbs

of verbs with the realis suffix
Reduplication of the entire stem including the realis suffix takes place. Only verbs can be inflected for realis mood.

of adverbials

of adjectives

*The adjectival base is first turned into a verb through reduplication, in order to allow the realis suffix to be reduplicated (only verbs can be reduplicated with a realis suffix).

of numerals

of nouns
Reduplication of nouns is rarer, and does not serve to express plurality of distributivity.

Kinship 
The Teiwa live in exogamous, patrilineal clans: the children belong to the clan of the father. The term "Teiwa" refers to a group of (sub) clans with the same ancestors. The Teiwa branch into two moieties (halves), which are separate genealogical supergroups, each of which includes multiple clans. 

Children are named with 1) clan name, 2) given name 3) father's family name, for example Teiwa Jance Wa'ng.

Kinship system 
The kinship system of the Teiwa is based on cross-cousins. This means that the children of same-sex siblings are considered to be siblings (brother, sister), and therefore not fit for marriage with one another. Children of non-same sex siblings of the parents are seen as cross-cousins and are the perfect candidates for marriage with each other. These children are also in a different clan than the children of the same-sex siblings of the parents.

Kinship terms 
The main kinship terms are listed here:

From the point of view of female ego:

The "classificatory siblings" refer to the actual siblings, as well as the children of the mother's sister and the father's brother. As it is considered rude to call family members by their given name, these siblings are addressed as matu' when older and bif when younger, and ka'au when the same sex as the speaker.

The "classificatory parents" are the father's brother (n-oma 'my father'), as well as the mother's sister (na-xala 'my mother'). Each person therefore has two sets of parents.

References

Further reading

External links 

 Alphabet and pronunciation

Alor–Pantar languages
Languages of Indonesia